The Beaver Dam Mountains are a  long mountain range located mostly in extreme southwest Washington County, Utah, west of St. George, with the south of the range extending into the Arizona Strip.

The range contains the Beaver Dam Mountains Wilderness which straddles the state's borders. The south of the range can be impressively seen from Interstate 15, as it traverses the corridor into Utah through the Virgin River Gorge, as the Virgin River exits the west of the Colorado Plateau.

Description
The range contains two sections. The northern massif is anchored by the highpoint (photo), of the West Mountain Peak (Washington County), . The eastern flank of the north massif contains Shivwits, Utah in the center of a section of the Paiute Indian Tribe of Utah, the Shivwits Band of Utah. Utah highway 91 traverses the northwest–southeast sections through Utah Hill Summit.

The center of the range is adjacent to the Highway 91 mountain pass, and Tahoari (peak), .

The mountains are the only place in Utah where Dudleya arizonica, a rare plant of the family Crassulaceae, can be found.

Access
The east and southeast of the range can be accessed by routes from St. George and Interstate 15.

References

External links

 Range highpoint: West Mountain Peak, peakbagger.com (coordinates)
 Tahoari (peak), range center (adjacent Utah Hill Summit) at Utah Peaks

Mountain ranges of the Mojave Desert
Mountain ranges of Mohave County, Arizona
Mountain ranges of Washington County, Utah
Mountain ranges of Utah
Mountain ranges of Arizona